The Junior Eurovision Song Contest 2006 was the fourth edition of the annual Junior Eurovision Song Contest for young singers aged 8 to 15. On 2 December 2006, the contest was broadcast live from Bucharest, Romania making it the second time the contest had been held in a capital city. It was organised by the Romanian national broadcaster, Romanian Television (TVR), in co-operation with the European Broadcasting Union (EBU).

The show was broadcast live in the competing countries, as well as Andorra, Bosnia and Herzegovina and the Australian television channel Special Broadcasting Service (SBS) that acquired the rights for broadcasting the show, which was broadcast on 1 January 2007. This was Serbia's first participation in a Eurovision event as an independent nation.

Location

Bidding phase and host selection
On 5 October 2005, it was confirmed that TVR had won the rights of hosting the contest over AVRO of the Netherlands (who hosted the next contest). Croatia also expressed an interest in hosting this contest.

Venue

Polyvalent Hall from Bucharest is a multi-purpose hall in Bucharest, Romania, located in the Tineretului Park. It is used for concerts, indoor sports such as tennis, gymnastics, dance, handball, volleyball, basketball, weightlifting, combat sports and professional wrestling. The hall was opened in 1974 but has since been renovated. It has a maximum seating capacity of 12,000 for concerts and 6,000 for handball.

Format

Presenters
The presenters in charge of conducting the event were Andreea Marin and Ioana Ivan, who also appeared in the green room. Marin has been a presenter at the host broadcaster since 1994 and achieved national fame as the host of Surprize, Surprize, the Romanian version of British light entertainment show Surprise Surprise, on TVR1. Ivan is an actress and television personality and the first child presenter of the event.

Opening and interval acts
The show was opened by various circus style dancers and performers including fifteen children, champions from the Romanian Gymnastics Federation, plus characters from the Bucharest State Circus and an on-stage appearance by Mihai Trăistariu, dressed as Count Dracula and was followed by the traditional flag parade introducing the 15 participating countries. The interval act included a performance by last year's winner Ksenia Sitnik, a "fight" between street dance and traditional Romanian dance in addition to a remix of songs by the last three Romanian participants at the contest.

Participation
Originally 16 countries had initially signed up for the contest but one unspecified country later dropped out.

Broadcasting in Belgium
Radio télévision belge de la communauté française (RTBF) of the French-speaking Wallonia in Belgium left the contest this year after co-hosting the previous edition with Flemish broadcaster Vlaamse Radio- en Televisieomroep (VRT). They claimed that continuing with the contest was not in their interests financially. The viewing figures for the 2005 contest for RTBF were also low. Belgium continued to be represented at the contest by VRT.

2007 Croatian withdrawal
Hrvatska radiotelevizija (HRT) of Croatia announced that they would withdraw from the 2007 edition and future contests, as otherwise they would have faced a fine from the EBU as they did not screen this year's event live and did not broadcast it on a nationally available network, instead airing it on satellite-only channel HRT Plus. Broadcasters previously had to screen the event live and on a channel available to the majority of the public however this rule was scrapped in 2007. Croatia withdrew the following year and would not participate for seven years until they returned in 2014.

Withdrawn countries
The Scandinavian broadcasters; DR of Denmark, Norsk rikskringkasting (NRK) of Norway and Sveriges Television (SVT) of Sweden; decided to withdraw from the contest for various reasons, one being that the content put too much pressure on the participating children. Instead they staged a solely Scandinavian contest called MGP Nordic in Stockholm, as they did in 2002. However, Sweden did participate, which was quite unexpected since they placed 15th all earlier years, with commercial broadcaster TV4 supplying Sweden's entry. This meant that Sweden participated in both contests.

ITV, the United Kingdom broadcaster of the contest from 2003 up until and including 2005, withdrew from the contest, after they were originally given the rights to broadcast it when the BBC declined the offer. In 2003, they broadcast the contest on main channel ITV, relegating it to ITV2 for the next two years due to bad viewer ratings, before their complete withdrawal in 2006.

Monaco had stated an interest to take part in the contest, however did not take part in the contest. Latvia also withdrew, mainly due to financial reasons. However they briefly returned to the contest in 2010 and 2011.

Serbia and Montenegro participated in the 2005 contest, but since then, Montenegro voted for independence. The EBU gave their national broadcaster, Radio televizija Crne Gore (RTCG), extra time to decide whether or not to participate, but they finally declined the invitation. It wasn't until 2014 that they would start participating in the Junior Eurovision.

Participants and results

Detailed voting results

12 points
Below is a summary of all 12 points received. All countries were given 12 points at the start of voting to ensure that no country finished with nul points.

Spokespersons 

 Joana Galo Costa
 George Ioannidies
 Tess Gaerthe
 Andrea Nastase
 Assol Gumenyuk
 Lucía
 Milica Stanišić
 Jack Curtis
 Denis Dimoski
 Amy Diamond
 Alexandros Chountas
 Liza Anton-Baychuk
 Sander Cliquet
 Lorena Jelusić
 Roman Kerimov

Other countries
For a country to be eligible for potential participation in the Junior Eurovision Song Contest, it needs to be an active member of the EBU. It is currently unknown whether the EBU issue invitations of participation to all 56 active members like they do for the Eurovision Song Contest.

 Armenian broadcaster ARMTV were negotiating with the EBU to debut. However, plans never came to fruition and they debuted a year later.

Broadcasts

Official album

Junior Eurovision Song Contest 2006, is a compilation album put together by the European Broadcasting Union, and was released by Universal Music Group in November 2006. The album features all the songs from the 2006 contest, along with karaoke versions.

See also
 Eurovision Song Contest 2006
 Eurovision Young Musicians 2006

Notes

References

External links
Official Junior Eurovision Song Contest website

2006
Junior Eurovision Song Contest 2006
Eurovision Song Contest 2006